The University of Nanking, known in Chinese as Jinling University (金陵大学, Jinling being the ancient name of Nanking) was a private university in Nanjing, China sponsored by American churches. Founded in 1888, it effectively become defunct in 1952 following the 1952 reorganization of Chinese higher education by the newly born PRC.

History
The Nanking University (汇文书院, Huiwen Shuyuan) was founded in 1888 by C.H. Fowler. Initially there were three faculties: liberal arts, divinity and medicine. In 1910, The Nanking University merged The Union Christian College (宏育书院, Hongyu Shuyuan, formed in 1900 by the merger of The Christian College (基督书院, Jidu Shuyuan, founded in 1891) and The Presbyterian College (益智书院, Yizhi Shuyuan, founded in 1894)) and changed the name to Private University of Nanking, and was registered with the New York State Education Department. It is the first educational institution in China officially named "university" in English.

In 1951, Ginling College (former Ginling Women University established in 1913) merged into University of Nanking. In 1952, University of Nanking was merged with Nanjing University.

Presidents
John Calvin Ferguson
G.A. Stuart
Arthur J. Bowen
Chen Yuguang
Fangxun Li (Fang-Hsuin Lee)

Notable alumni
Ching Chun Li, geneticist, Chairman of American Society of Human Genetics.
Choh Hao Li, biologist, biochemist. His achievements include isolating and synthesizing the human pituitary growth hormone. He received many honors including Lasker Award.
Choh-Ming Li, educationist, economist.
Francois Cheng, writer, poet. A "Bridge Between Eastern and Western Culture".
T. C. Tso, agriculturalist, tobacco scientist.
Te-Tzu Chang, agriculturalist. Member of Academia Sinica. He receives Tyler Prize in 1999.
Thome H. Fang, philosopher.
W. B. Pettus, educator.
Wang Yinglai, biochemist who achieved the synthesis of insulin
Wu Teh Yao, educationist, politics scholar.
Zhang Zhiwen, agriculturist, Vice Director General of FAO of United Nations.

Notable faculty

Zou Bingwen, agriculturist, the Vice Chairman of Organising Committee of Food and Agriculture Organization of the United Nations.
Albin Bro, fourth president of Shimer College.
John Lossing Buck, agricultural economist 
Pearl S. Buck, writer.
Charles W. Woodworth, Professor Emeritus and founder of the Entomology Division U.C. Berkeley (1891-1930) was a lecturer in Entomology during his sabbatical in 1918.  He was there then again between 1921-4. (See the C. W. Woodworth Award.)

References

External links
University of Nanking 金陵大學

 
Universities and colleges in Nanjing
1888 establishments in China
Major National Historical and Cultural Sites in Jiangsu